Ajo is the capital of Bareyo municipality in Cantabria, Spain.

History

The first historical written reference to Ajo (Asio) is in the "Liber Testamentarum" of Oviedo Cathedral from 923, in which the King Ordoño II of León donated the church of San Juan de Asio. Popular etymology without any basis says that the name comes from the great quantity of garlic that the town's inhabitants consumed and that gave the locality a typical smell.

Economy

25% of the population of the municipality works in the primary sector, 19.1% in construction, 9.5% in industry and 46.4% in the services sector. The jobs of more than 78% of the population are related to the garlic industry.

Means of information

The municipal corporation has published since 2007 the Ojerada magazine, which reports on various activities in the municipality.
Since 2010, the municipality has a means of information managed by neighbors that has become a reference for local information in Cantabria. It is the Bareyo Digital or Bareyo Digital Media.

References

External links
 http://www.aytobareyo.org/

Populated places in Cantabria